Cascades-Malignes is an unorganized territory in the Outaouais region of Quebec, Canada, one of five unorganized territories in the La Vallée-de-la-Gatineau Regional County Municipality.

The territory is named after the Cascades Malignes (French for "Malicious Cascades") which are a series of chutes on the Gens de Terre River. This river forms the eastern boundary of the territory and of the La Vérendrye Wildlife Reserve as well. The log drivers who went down this river had nicknamed it La Maline (malignant) because its flow hid many obstacles. It is also known as Malin Rapides.

Demographics
Population trend:
 Population in 2011: 0
 Population in 2006: 0
 Population in 2001: 0

References

Unorganized territories in Outaouais